Víctor García de la Concha (born 2 January 1934, Villaviciosa, Asturias) is a Spanish philologist. He is a past director of the Cervantes Institute and a past director of the Royal Spanish Academy. He served three four-year terms in that position, from 1998 to 2010. Directors usually serve no more than two terms.

Life & career
De la Concha took his bachelor's degree in Philosophy from the University of Oviedo and in Theology from the Pontifical Gregorian University in Rome. He taught at several institutions and universities, including the University of Valladolid, University of Murcia and University of Zaragoza, until he obtained the Chair of Spanish Literature at the University of Salamanca.

He was one of the scriptwriters for the 1984 TV mini-series, Teresa de Jesús, and had a cameo role in one episode, playing the Archbishop of Seville, who blesses Teresa (while some of his University colleagues hold a canopy over them). In 1987, he became manager of the literary magazine Ínsula

In 1992, he entered the Royal Spanish Academy as an Academic Numerary, occupying seat (c). The next year, he became Secretary and, in 1998, Director. In 2000, he was named a Doctor Honoris Causa in Letters at Francisco Morazán National Pedagogic University in Tegucigalpa, on the occasion of his visit to the Academia Hondureña de la Lengua.
In 2009, he received the Lázaro Carreter Prize, and in 2010, King Juan Carlos I named him a Knight of the Order of the Golden Fleece.

In 2011, he received the Menéndez Pelayo International Prize, and in January 2012, was named director of the Cervantes Institute.

Selected works
 La Poesía Española de Posguerra, Prensa Española (1973)
 El Arte Literario de Santa Teresa, Ariel (1978) 
 León Felipe: Itinerario Poético, Consejeria de Educacion y Cultura (1986) 
 La Poesía Española de 1935 a 1975, Catedra (1987) 
 Nueva Lectura del Lazarillo, Castalia (1993) 
 Al Aire de su Vuelo: Estudios Sobre Santa Teresa, Fray Luis de León, San Juan de la Cruz y Calderón de la Barca, Galaxia Gutenberg (2004)  
 Cinco Novelas en Clave Simbólica, Alfaguara (2010)

References

External links
Cervantes Institute

Spanish philologists
Members of the Royal Spanish Academy
Academic staff of the University of Salamanca
Knights of the Golden Fleece of Spain
1934 births
Living people